Jalan Joned (Johor state route J59) (Jawi: جالن جونيد) is a major road in Johor, Malaysia. There are many parit (canal) along this road.

List of junctions

Roads in Muar